is a Japanese footballer who plays as a defender for Ehime.

Career statistics
.

Notes

References

External links

2001 births
Living people
Japanese footballers
Japan youth international footballers
Association football defenders
J2 League players
Ehime FC players